The Peace, Equality and Prosperity Party was a political party in British Guiana led by Kelvin De Freitas.

History
The party contested the 1964 general elections, nominating three candidates, with its campaign was concentrated around Georgetown. They received only 0.5% of the vote and failed to win a seat. The party did not contest any further elections.

References

Defunct political parties in Guyana